Sinthetic is the debut album by the Finnish dark metal band Shade Empire. The ninth track, "End of Dreams", is not listed in the CD, it can be regarded as a bonus or simply an outro.

Track listing
"Conjuration" – 4:50
"Pain & Pleasure" – 5:23
"Human Sculpture" (feat. Marko Hietala) – 4:57
"Designed for Blood" (feat. Spellgoth) – 6:00
"Creation of Death" – 4:28
"Ja pimeys laskeutui" – 3:21
"Extreme Form of Hatred" – 4:20
"Demonized" – 5:46
"End of Dreams" – 2:33

Credits
Juha Harju – vocal, lyrics
Janne Niiranen – guitar
Juha Sirkkiä – guitar
Olli Savolainen – synthesizers
Eero Mantere – bass guitar
Antti Makkonen – drums
Marko Hietala – clean Vocals (on "Human Sculpture")
Engineered by Sami Jämsén
Mastered by Minerva Pappi at Finnvox Studios
Artwork by Alan S. Smith

References

External links
Shade Empire Discography

Shade Empire albums
2004 debut albums